The 1959–60 season was FC Steaua București's 12th season since its founding in 1947.

Divizia A

League table

Results 

Source:

Cupa României

Results

See also

 1959–60 Cupa României
 1959–60 Divizia A

Notes and references

External links
 1959–60 FC Steaua București Divizia A matches

FC Steaua București seasons
1959–60 in Romanian football
Steaua, București
Steaua
Romanian football championship-winning seasons